Arash Shahamati (born 18 March 1998) is an Iranian footballer who plays as a defender for Persian Gulf Pro League club Zob Ahan.

References

1998 births
Living people
People from Ardabil
Iranian footballers
Association football defenders
Naft Tehran F.C. players
Esteghlal F.C. players